Hurst Park Club Ground is a cricket ground in East Molesey, Surrey.  The ground formerly occupied the round area inside Hurst Park Racecourse.  The first recorded match was in 1890 when it hosted its only first-class match between Hurst Park Club and the touring Australians.  The ground moved to the far east of the park.  93 years later, Surrey played a single List-A match at the ground against Northamptonshire.

In local domestic cricket, the ground is the home venue of East Molesey Cricket Club.  The pavilion at the ground was constructed in the 1950s.

References

External links
Hurst Park Club Ground on CricketArchive
Hurst Park Club Ground on Cricinfo

Cricket grounds in Surrey
Surrey County Cricket Club grounds
Borough of Elmbridge
Sports venues completed in 1890